The Don Rickles Show is an American comedy television series. The series stars Don Rickles, Louise Sorel, Erin Moran, Robert Hogan, and Joyce Van Patten. The series aired on CBS from January 14 until May 26, 1972. It ranked 56th out of 78 shows that season with an average 15.5 rating. It shares the same title as a short-lived variety series that Rickles had headlined on ABC in 1968.

Premise
The Don Rickles Show focused on an advertising agency executive, and his "life and endless problems" with his job and his family. Don Robinson, the main character, encountered difficulties both at work and at home. His battles apparently did not appeal to audiences, leading to the series's four-month run.

Cast 
 Don Rickles as Don Robinson
 Louise Sorel as Barbara Robinson
 Erin Moran as Janie Robinson
 Robert Hogan as Tyler Benedict
 Joyce Van Patten as Jean Benedict
 Barry Gordon as Conrad Musk
 Judith Cassmore as Audrey

Personnel
Sheldon Leonard and Joseph Sandore were executive producers, Hy Averback was the producer, and Sam Denoff was the creator and executive consultant.

Episodes

References

External links
 

1970s American sitcoms
1972 American television series debuts
1972 American television series endings
English-language television shows
CBS original programming
Television shows set in New York City